Nilphamari-3 is a constituency represented in the Jatiya Sangsad (National Parliament) of Bangladesh since 2019 by Rana Mohammad Sohel of the Jatiya Party (Ershad).

Boundaries 
The constituency encompasses Jaldhaka Upazila.

History 
The constituency was created in 1984 from a Rangpur constituency when the former Rangpur District was split into five districts: Nilphamari, Lalmonirhat, Rangpur, Kurigram, and Gaibandha.

Ahead of the 2018 general election, the Election Commission altered the boundaries of the constituency. Previously it included three union parishads of Kishoreganj Upazila: Barabhita, Putimari, and Ranachandi.

Members of Parliament

Elections

Elections in the 2010s

Elections in the 2000s

Elections in the 1990s

References

External links
 

Parliamentary constituencies in Bangladesh
Nilphamari District